The Lao National Tourism Administration (LNTA) is the government agency responsible for managing, promoting, and developing the tourism industry of Laos. The LNTA is a ministry-level agency, reporting directly to the prime minister's office.  

, the chairman of the LNTA was Somphong Mongkhonvilay. LNTA's headquarters is in Vientiane.

See also
Government of Laos
Tourism in Laos

References

Government of Laos
Tourism in Laos
Laos
Vientiane